Jeff Campbell may refer to:

 Jeff Campbell (American football) (born 1968), American football player who played wide receiver for the Detroit Lions and Denver Broncos
 Jeff Campbell (businessman) (fl. 2000s), American restaurant business executive
 Jeff Campbell (ice hockey) (born 1981), Canadian ice hockey player
 Jeff Campbell (footballer) (born 1979), New Zealand soccer player
 Jeffrey Campbell (water polo) (born 1962), American water polo player
 Jeff Campbell (Family Guy), a fictional character
 Jeff Campbell (politician) (born 1966), member of the Virginia House of Delegates
 Jeff Campbell (musician), American musician and singer-songwriter

See also
 Geoffrey Campbell (disambiguation)